Warmenau is a river of North Rhine-Westphalia and of Lower Saxony, Germany. It flows into the Else near Bünde.

See also
List of rivers of North Rhine-Westphalia
List of rivers of Lower Saxony

References

Rivers of North Rhine-Westphalia
Rivers of Lower Saxony
Rivers of Germany